Galen Wahlmeier (February 19, 1934 – July 26, 2018) was a Canadian football player who played for the Saskatchewan Roughriders. He won the Grey Cup with them in 1966. He played college football at University of Kansas. In 1985, he was in a movie called Shipbuilder. Wahlmeier later served as mayor of Estevan, Saskatchewan. In 2018, he died in Kipling, Saskatchewan.

References

1934 births
2018 deaths
People from Decatur County, Kansas
Saskatchewan Roughriders players
Players of American football from Kansas
People from Estevan
Mayors of places in Saskatchewan